Paul Winslow is a former defensive back in the National Football League. He was drafted by the Green Bay Packers in the thirteenth round of the 1960 NFL Draft and played that season with the team.

In the 1961 NFL Expansion Draft Paul Winslow was Selected, for the newly created NFL franchise, the Minnesota Vikings .

References

1938 births
Living people
People from Elizabeth City, North Carolina
Players of American football from North Carolina
American football running backs
North Carolina Central Eagles football players
Green Bay Packers players